Mehbudi-ye Olya (also Romanized as Mehbūdī-ye ‘Olyā; also known as Mehbūdī-ye Bālā) is a village in Famur Rural District, Jereh and Baladeh District, Kazerun County, Fars Province, Iran. At the 2006 census, its population was 49, in 9 families.

References 

Populated places in Kazerun County